Athabasca was a provincial electoral district in Alberta, Canada, mandated to return a single member to the Legislative Assembly of Alberta from 1905 to 1986.

History
The Athabasca electoral district was one of the original 25 electoral districts contested in the 1905 Alberta general election upon Alberta joining Confederation in September 1905. Throughout the years the district's boundaries would continue to change; however, the district would remain in North-East Alberta throughout the 81 years of its existence.

The Athabasca electoral district would return a single member to the Legislative Assembly through first-past-the-post system of voting from 1905 until 1924, when the United Farmers government introduced the new The Alberta Election Act which would institute instant-runoff voting in rural electoral districts throughout the province. Instant-runoff voting would remain until the Social Credit government introduced amendments to The Election Act prior to the 1959 Alberta general election which returned every district in the province to a single member elected through first-past-the-post voting system. Instant-runoff voting would have a relatively minor effect on the Athabasca district, as elected members received a plurality of votes (above 50%) in all general elections besides 1926, 1940 and 1955.

The Athabasca district was re-distributed prior to the 1986 Alberta general election. The area the district covered was merged with Lac La Biche to form the riding of Athabasca-Lac La Biche.

Members of the Legislative Assembly (MLAs)

Boundary history

Election results

1905 general election

The Athabasca electoral district was created in 1905 as part of the original twenty-five electoral districts when Alberta was formed  into a province from the Northwest Territories. The district consisted mostly of undeveloped wilderness covering the eastern half of northern Alberta. In 1905 the primary occupation was hunting and trapping and the local economy existed around the fur trade. The town of Athabasca, which was the only major settlement in the district, was experiencing a boom at that time as people flocked north to buy real estate.

The provincial Liberal party nominated William Fletcher Bredin as their candidate. He was a pioneer fur trader and was well known in the district. He made history by becoming the first person acclaimed to serve in the Legislative Assembly of Alberta. The provincial Conservative party being very weak in organization in northern Alberta was unable to find a candidate to oppose him. This was the only electoral district during this general election that sent a candidate to Edmonton by acclamation.

1909 general election

1913 general election

1917 general election

1918 by-election

1920 by-election

1921 general election

1926 general election

1930 general election

1935 general election

1935 by-election

1940 general election

1944 general election

1948 general election

1952 general election

1955 general election

1959 general election

1963 general election

1967 general election

1971 general election

1975 general election

1979 general election

1982 general election

Plebiscite results

1948 electrification plebiscite
District results from the first province wide plebiscite on electricity regulation:

1957 liquor plebiscite

On October 30, 1957, a stand-alone plebiscite was held province wide in all 50 of the then current provincial electoral districts in Alberta. The government decided to consult Alberta voters to decide on liquor sales and mixed drinking after a divisive debate in the legislature. The plebiscite was intended to deal with the growing demand for reforming antiquated liquor control laws.

The plebiscite was conducted in two parts. Question A, asked in all districts, asked the voters if the sale of liquor should be expanded in Alberta, while Question B, asked in a handful of districts within the corporate limits of Calgary and Edmonton, asked if men and women should be allowed to drink together in establishments.

Province wide Question A of the plebiscite passed in 33 of the 50 districts while Question B passed in all five districts. Athbasca voted by a large majority in favor of the issue. The district recorded one of the lowest turnouts, well below the province wide 46% average.

Official district returns were released to the public on December 31, 1957. The Social Credit government in power at the time did not consider the results binding. However, the results of the vote led the government to repeal all existing liquor legislation and introduce an entirely new Liquor Act.

Municipal districts lying inside electoral districts that voted against the plebiscite were designated Local Option Zones by the Alberta Liquor Control Board and considered effective dry zones. Business owners who wanted a license had to petition for a binding municipal plebiscite in order to be granted a license.

By-elections and member party changes
September 27, 1918 — Appointment of Alexander Grant MacKay as the Minister of Municipal Affairs
June 3, 1920 — Death of Alexander Grant MacKay
November 4, 1935 — Resignation of Clarence Tade to provide a seat for Minister Charles Cathmer Ross
November 7, 1938 — Death of Charles Cathmer Ross
1921 - 1926 — George Mills became an Independent Liberal (date not available).
1926 - 1930 — John W. Frame crossed the floor from the Liberals to the United Farmers of Alberta (date not available).

See also
List of Alberta provincial electoral districts
Athabaska, a federal electoral district in Alberta that was represented in the House of Commons of Canada from 1925 to 1968

References

Further reading

External links
Elections Alberta
The Legislative Assembly of Alberta

Former provincial electoral districts of Alberta